The Peugeot Satelis Compressor is a scooter made by the French company Peugeot from 2006 to 2012. In 2005, Peugeot created the Jet Force Compressor, the first scooter with a compressor (supercharger). This scooter was produced in two models, K15 for 15 hp, and K20 for 20 hp. This is due to the French law which allows people owning a B driving license (for cars) to drive motorbikes and scooters up to 125 cc and 15 hp. So the first model can be driven by an ordinary B car license, while the second needs a specific A motorbike license. Each model was available in 3 options:  Premium, City (with padlock), and Executive (with padlock + ABS).

References

See also
 Peugeot Motocycles

Satelis Compressor
Motor scooters